KSFE (96.7 MHz) is an FM radio station in Grants, New Mexico, United States. It is owned by Vanguard Media and currently features an electronic dance music format branded as "96.7 Pirate Radio". The station features a continuous mix of various EDM genres such as progressive house, deep house, drum and bass, techno, trance and many others from both local and international mix DJs. Zaid Gonzalez, a local DJ and producer is the content director for the station.

The broadcasting tower is located at the La Mosca Lookout on Mount Taylor.

History
The station launched in 2012 as KMYN, airing a classic country format simulcast from KMIN AM 980. Later in about 2016, it would switch to a simulcast of KOAZ airing a smooth jazz format while also feeding translator K240EC 95.9 in Santa Fe. It was sold by original owner Royal Diversified Industries to Vanguard Media effective July 1, 2020 for $375,000.

On September 1, 2020, KSFE switched to simulcasting the Regional Mexican format from KDLW "La Zeta" in Albuquerque. The simulcast was discontinued on January 3, 2022, when KDLW rebranded as "Exitos" and for the first time KSFE began to air its own programming.

References

External links

SFE
Radio stations established in 2012
2012 establishments in New Mexico
Dance radio stations
Electronic dance music radio stations